Pishel Creek is a  long 2nd order tributary to the Niobrara River in Knox County, Nebraska.  This is the only stream of this name in the United States.

Course
Pishel Creek rises on the North Branch Verdigre Creek divide about 2.5 miles Knoxville, Nebraska in Knox County and then flows north straddling the Knox-Holt County line and then turns northeast to join the Niobrara River at Pishelville, Nebraska.

Watershed
Pishel Creek drains  of area, receives about 24.02 in/year of precipitation, has a wetness index of 454.61, and is about 5.42% forested.

See also

List of rivers of Nebraska

References

Rivers of Holt County, Nebraska
Rivers of Knox County, Nebraska
Rivers of Nebraska